Nottarp Glacier is a small glacier draining eastward into Lowery Glacier just south of Mount Damm in the Queen Elizabeth Range. Mapped by the United States Geological Survey (USGS) from tellurometer surveys and Navy air photos, 1960–62. Named by Advisory Committee on Antarctic Names (US-ACAN) for Klemens J. Nottarp, United States Antarctic Research Program (USARP) glaciologist on the Ross Ice Shelf, 1962–63 and 1965–66.

Glaciers of Shackleton Coast